The Swiss Science Council (SSC) is an independent scientific advisory body of the Federal Council of Switzerland. Founded on March 26, 1965, the SSC advises the Swiss federal government on all issues relating to science, higher education, research and innovation policy. Between 2000 and 2013, the advisory body was called Swiss Science and Technology Council, and from 2014 to 2017 Swiss Science and Innovation Council (SSIC). Since 2018, it has resumed its original name.

Organization 
The SSC is an extra-parliamentary commission, as formulated in Articles 54 and 55 of the Federal Law on the Promotion of Research and Innovation.

A council of 15 members (professors of various disciplines) is headed by the president Sabine Süsstrunk (as of 2021). The president is supported by an administrative office, which includes scientific advisors, an information service and administrative staff. The office is led by Claudia Acklin.

Tasks 
The SSC advises the federal government in order to fostering the "continuous optimisation of the framework conditions for the flourishing development of the Swiss education, research and innovation landscape". The council regularly publishes reports and studies on current science policy issues.

It issues statements on individual projects or problems in the field of education, research and innovation (ERI) on behalf of the Federal Council of Switzerland or on its own initiative and also acts as an evaluation body. The Information Service compiles information on topics in the area of ERI in Switzerland and abroad.

The Work Programme 2020–2023 focuses on lessons learned from the COVID-19 pandemic, the appropriate size and organisation of the Swiss ERI system, as well as on education, research and innovation in a digital society. The programme also includes evaluations, reviews and impact assessments.

See also 
 Science and technology in Switzerland

Notes and references

External links 
 

Science and technology in Switzerland
Scientific organisations based in Switzerland
Government agencies of Switzerland
Science policy
1965 establishments in Switzerland